Olena Sayko (born 14 April 1987) is a Ukrainian sambist. She is 2015 and 2019 European Games silver medalist in women's sambo. She is 2007 World champion, 2008 European champion and multiple medalist of World and European championships. Sayko also won silver medal at the 2013 Summer Universiade.

References

External links
 
 

1987 births
Living people
Ukrainian sambo practitioners
Sambo practitioners at the 2015 European Games
Sambo practitioners at the 2019 European Games
European Games medalists in sambo
European Games silver medalists for Ukraine
Universiade silver medalists for Ukraine
Medalists at the 2013 Summer Universiade